The 2nd West Virginia Veteran Infantry Regiment was an infantry regiment that served in the Union Army during the American Civil War.

Service
The 2nd West Virginia Veteran Infantry Regiment was created by the amalgamation of the 1st West Virginia Infantry Regiment (3 Year) and the 5th West Virginia Infantry Regiment on December 10, 1864. It mustered out of service on July 16, 1865.

Casualties
The 2nd West Virginia Veteran Infantry Regiment suffered one enlisted man killed or mortally wounded in battle and 16 enlisted men dead from disease for a total of 17 fatalities.

References

See also
West Virginia Units in the Civil War
West Virginia in the Civil War

Units and formations of the Union Army from West Virginia
1864 establishments in West Virginia
Military units and formations established in 1864
Military units and formations disestablished in 1865